Meta is both a surname and a given name. Notable people with the name include:

Surname:
Beqir Meta, Albanian historian
Ilir Meta (born 1969), Albanian President
Kenichiro Meta (born 1982), Japanese football player
Ermal Meta (born 1981) Italian-Albanian singer

Given name:
Meta Brevoort (1825–1876), American mountain climber
Meta Davis Cumberbatch (1900–1978), Trinidad-born pianist, composer, writer and cultural activist
Meta Elste-Neumann (1919–2010), German-American gymnast
Meta Vaux Warrick Fuller (1877–1968), African-American artist
Meta Given (1888–1981), American nutritionist, home economist, and cookbook author
Meta Golding (born 1971), Haitian-American actress and former figure skater
Meta Luts (1905–1958), Estonian actress
Meta Mayne Reid (1905–1991), Northern Irish children's writer
Meta Orred (1845 or 1846–1925), Scottish author and poet
Meta Ramsay, Baroness Ramsay of Cartvale (born 1936), British Labour Party member of the House of Lords
Meta Seinemeyer (1895–1929), German operatic spinto soprano
Margaret Tuke (1862–1947), British academic and educator
Meta Vannas (1924–2003), Soviet Estonian politician
Meta Vidmar (1899–1975), Slovene modern dancer

See also
Metta (given name)

Estonian feminine given names
Given names derived from gemstones
Albanian-language surnames